Joe Coombs (born 17 March 1991 in Salisbury) is a British canoe slalom athlete who competed between 2003 and 2014. His results include a Silver Medal at the Junior European Championships in 2009 (team-event), 15th at the ICF Senior Pre-world Championships in 2010, and a UK ranking of 5th.

Coombs also competed for Nottingham Trent University and took 3 golds in the 2011 BUCS Canoe Slalom Championships.

References

External links 
 Official Website

Living people
1991 births
English male canoeists
Sportspeople from Salisbury
Alumni of Nottingham Trent University